Michael Robert John Veletta (born 30 October 1963) is a former Australian cricketer.

He played in eight Test matches and 20 One Day Internationals between 1987 and 1990. He played 127 first-class matches including 114 Sheffield Shield matches, and 41 domestic one-day matches for Western Australia.

International career
In the 1987 Cricket World Cup Veletta played a pivotal role for Australia. In the final against England he slammed 45 off only 31 balls, an innings that was ultimately decisive as Australia edged out England by the narrow margin of seven runs. However at Test level he never really performed to his potential. The dogged opener got numerous starts, but failed to reach a half-century, his highest score being 39. He toured India in 1986.

Veletta was dropped from the Test side after a score of 9 against Pakistan in the washed out 3rd Test played in Sydney in February 1990. He was in the 1989 Ashes tour party to England and appeared in a One Day International as a wicket-keeper.

Coaching career
In 2001 he was appointed coach of the Western Warriors; however the Western Australian Cricket Association terminated the contract after two years of the three-year contract. The remainder of his contract was paid out in full. He coached the Domestic One day side the Canberra Comets from 1995–96 to 1998–99.

References

Notes

External links 
 

1963 births
Living people
Australia One Day International cricketers
Australia Test cricketers
Cricketers at the 1987 Cricket World Cup
Australian cricket coaches
Western Australia cricketers
ACT Comets cricketers
Cricketers from Perth, Western Australia
Australian cricketers
Wicket-keepers